It's is the second mini-album by South Korean boy group Teen Top. The mini-album was released on January 9, 2012 and contains six tracks. "Going Crazy" was used as the promotional track for the mini-album. The mini-album debuted at number 3 on the Gaon Album Chart on January 18, 2012.

Background
With six tracks, the album was produced by Brave Brothers Kang Dong Chul, who took on not only the production, but writing, composition, and mixing processes as well to ensure its high quality.

"It's" is filled with an intro, an instrumental, a remix of the title track, and another three full music tracks. The mini album starts off with Teen Top's self-titled intro before it moves to its title track, "Going Crazy". The songs are followed by "Where's Ma Girl" and the slower "Girl Friend". The mini album then moves on to a R&B version of "Going Crazy" before adding another instrumental of the title track.

Track listing

Chart performance
Their title track, "Going Crazy" was the #1 most downloaded ringtone in Korea early January 2012. On January 20, the weekly mobile ringtone chart on major Korean portal site Nate.com revealed that TEEN TOP’s “Going Crazy” triumphed T-ara‘s “Lovey Dovey” to secure the #1 spot.

Charts

Album chart

Single chart

Sales and certifications

References

2012 EPs
Teen Top EPs